Dress for Success may refer to:

Dress for Success (book), a best-selling 1975 book by John T. Molloy
Dress For Success (organization), established by Nancy Lublin to provide women with interview suits and career development training
"Dress for Success" (Ugly Betty), an episode from the third season of the TV series Ugly Betty